Reginald Glenn Querl (born 4 April 1988) is a Zimbabwean cricketer. A right-handed batsman and right-arm medium-fast bowler, Querl represented Zimbabwe at Under-19 level in the Afro-Asia Under-19 Cup in November 2005, and during the 2006 Under-19 World Cup. In 2010, Querl was selected as one of 21 players to form the first Unicorns squad to take part in the Clydesdale Bank 40 domestic limited overs competition against the regular first-class counties. The Unicorns comprised 15 former county cricket professionals and 6 young cricketers looking to establish themselves in the professional game. Querl played for the Unicorns in the 2011 Clydesdale Bank 40.

Querl made his first-class cricket debut against the Southern Rocks for Matabeleland Tuskers, taking 9 wickets for 101 runs on debut. In his second first-class match, he took 9 wickets for 39 runs. After retiring from playing, Querl was appointed head coach of the Scorchers women's cricket team in Ireland in 2020. The following year he was appointed Women's Performance and Pathway Coach by Cricket Ireland, supporting Ed Joyce in his role as head coach of the Ireland women's cricket team.

References

External links

1988 births
Living people
Zimbabwean cricketers
Unicorns cricketers
Matabeleland cricketers
White Zimbabwean sportspeople
Hampshire cricketers
Zimbabwean cricket coaches